Ginaton is a moshav in central Israel. Located near Ben Shemen, it falls under the jurisdiction of Hevel Modi'in Regional Council.

History
The village was established in 1949 by immigrants from Bulgaria, near the ancient site of Jindas, inhabited during the Late Roman, Byzantine, Early Islamic, Crusader, Mamluk and Ottoman periods. Its name is taken from the Book of Nehemiah 10:7. The founders were later joined by more immigrants from Hungary, Iran, North Africa and Romania.

References

External links
Ginaton winery : Israeli wine from Ginaton

Moshavim
Populated places established in 1949
Populated places in Central District (Israel)
1949 establishments in Israel
Bulgarian-Jewish culture in Israel
Iranian-Jewish culture in Israel
Hungarian-Jewish culture in Israel
North African-Jewish culture in Israel
Romanian-Jewish culture in Israel